Inshas is a village located in Bilbeis, Sharqia Governorate, 60 kilometers east of Cairo, Egypt.

It holds the first experimental nuclear reactor to be operated in Egypt ETRR-1 as well as the second experimental reactor ETRR-2, the Egyptian Atomic Energy Authority Experimental Farm, unauthorized IAEA.

Following the creation of the Arab League in March 1945, Inshas held the first Arab League Summit in May 1946.

References

Arab League
Sharqia Governorate
Populated places in Sharqia Governorate
Villages in Egypt